Lopezville is a census-designated place (CDP) in Hidalgo County, Texas. The population was 4,333 at the 2010 United States Census. It is part of the McAllen–Edinburg–Mission Metropolitan Statistical Area. The town developed during the early 1960s as a trailer park. It is named for Francisco Solano López, a former president of Paraguay, a descendant of whom founded his namesake trailer park.

Geography
Lopezville is located at  (26.245789, -98.156402).

Demographics
As of the census of 2000, there were 4,476 people, 1,035 households, and 963 families residing in the CDP. The population density was 2,520.5 people per square mile (970.9/km2). There were 1,117 housing units at an average density of 629.0/sq mi (242.3/km2). The racial makeup of the CDP was 91.35% White, 0.20% African American, 0.04% Asian, 7.19% from other races, and 1.21% from two or more races. Hispanic or Latino of any race were 98.19% of the population.

There were 1,035 households, out of which 61.4% had children under the age of 18 living with them, 70.3% were married couples living together, 16.7% had a female householder with no husband present, and 6.9% were non-families. 6.3% of all households were made up of individuals, and 3.0% had someone living alone who was 65 years of age or older. The average household size was 4.32 and the average family size was 4.49.

In the CDP, the population was spread out, with 40.0% under the age of 18, 14.7% from 18 to 24, 26.2% from 25 to 44, 14.3% from 45 to 64, and 4.8% who were 65 years of age or older. The median age was 23 years. For every 100 females, there were 98.8 males. For every 100 females age 18 and over, there were 92.1 males.

The median income for a household in the CDP was $17,935, and the median income for a family was $19,149. Males had a median income of $12,563 versus $15,518 for females. The per capita income for the CDP was $5,254. About 46.1% of families and 54.0% of the population were below the poverty line, including 58.5% of those under age 18 and 30.8% of those age 65 or over.

Education
The Edinburg Consolidated Independent School District (ECISD) and the Pharr-San Juan-Alamo Independent School District (PSJAISD) serve sections of Lopezville.

Zoned ECISD elementary schools serving sections of Lopezville include De Escandon and Ramirez (grades PK-5). All residents of the ECISD section of Lopezville are zoned to South Middle School. ECISD high schools serving sections of Lopezville include Edinburg High School and Robert Vela High School (9-12).

Zoned PSJAISD schools include Arnoldo Cantu, Sr. Elementary School (North San Juan), R. Yzaguirre Middle School (SJMS), and PSJA High School.

In addition, South Texas Independent School District operates magnet schools that serve the community.

All of Hidalgo County is in the service area of South Texas College.

References

Census-designated places in Hidalgo County, Texas
Census-designated places in Texas